Emanuelle in America is a 1977 Italian sexploitation film, the third in the Black Emanuelle series starring Laura Gemser It is the second in the series to be directed by Joe D'Amato and has journalist Emanuelle investigate the production of snuff films, among other things. In some cuts, which were only released in certain markets, the film contains scenes of hardcore pornography, graphic violence and bestiality.

Plot 
In a Manhattan studio, Emanuelle shoots a nude photo shoot. Janet, one of her models, tells her about her relationship with Tony, a philosopher, and complains that nothing ever happens but talk. In her car, Emanuelle gets hijacked by Tony, who puts a gun against her head and says he will kill her because of her sexual immorality, the root of all the evils of the present. Emanuelle finds out about his sexual childhood trauma, argues for the cleanliness of sex, and starts to perform fellatio on him. Panic-stricken, Tony runs away.

In their apartment, Emanuelle's boyfriend Bill plays with Tony's gun while she prepares to leave for a meeting. Craving sex, he playfully threatens to demonstrate his love by committing suicide, putting the gun against his head, and gets Emanuelle to postpone and have sex with him.

Planning to investigate billionaire Van Darren, Emanuelle visits a downtown boxing gymnasium to meet Joe, a former fighter turned trainer after being replaced as Van Darren's bodyguard by “Charlie”. Van Darren's harem consists of twelve zodiacal women, the only current opening being for a Virgo. Joe provides her with false papers.

At Van Darren's villa, Emanuelle is received by “Charlie”, whom she seduces and has sex with. At the pool, she joins two of the women for a lesbian underwater game. Investigating the stables, she finds a weapons stash labelled “horse shoes”. Guest at Van Darren's is Alfredo Elvize, the Duke of Elba, who in contrast to his host has an unusually monogamous attitude. In the evening, everyone secretly watches one of the women giving a hand job to Pedro, her favorite horse. Alone with Van Darren, Emanuelle ridicules him for his power- and money-centered approach to sex. In the game room, she then beats him at poker dice, ridiculing him again, in front of everyone. She secretly leaves in Elvize's car and is invited to his Venetian palazzo.

Arriving at the palazzo, Emanuelle witnesses a marital crisis: The duke catches his wife with another man, and in turn sleeps with Emanuelle. When his wife joins them, Emanuelle leaves, thereby happily reuniting the couple. When Bill arrives for a two-hour stay, the couple have sex in a palazzo during a rehearsal of the Spring concerto. At a party in the duke's palazzo, Emanuelle learns of a Caribbean island resort which offers beautiful men to sex-starved women. She also discovers the duke's hidden stash of real and forged paintings. With a pop out cake, the party turns into an orgy, and Emanuelle takes pictures. The next day, she leaves with the gondolier who brought her, telling him he is the purest memory she will have of Venice.

Back at the Manhattan studio, Janet tells her that sex is all that Tony thinks of now. Alone again, Emanuelle has phone sex with Bill.

Emanuelle poses as a client to infiltrate the Caribbean island resort. She takes pictures of the various couples and their sexual role plays, among them Tarzan and Zorro. One of the women watches an 8 mm snuff film during sex, which shocks Emanuelle. Her cover is blown when one of the male sex workers recognizes her from one of her journals. She escapes by seducing, drugging and raping the resort's lesbian director Diana Smith and getting into the cab of the chauffeur with whom she came. They have sex in the car.

Back in New York and on the trail of the snuff film, her editor points her to a former agent, who in turn gives her the name of a US senator. After observing the senator and his family in Washington, Emanuelle “accidentally” soils his jacket at a restaurant. Taking her for a walk past government buildings, the senator presents himself as a conservative patriot and invites her to his studio. When he puts on a pornographic film, Emanuelle pretends being bored. The senator then drugs her drink and puts on the snuff film. While watching, Emanuelle goes into a drug trip in which she travels with the senator to South America and witnesses the torture and rape with her own eyes. In the morning, she promises the senator to visit him again.

Back at the newspaper, Emanuelle is uncertain if what she saw was real until her editor shows her her pictures which he developed. Emanuelle now sees it as the scoop of the century but her editor tells her he has received orders from the top not to publish them. Although he promises to do so the first chance he gets, Emanuelle shouts at him in front of everyone and announces to take a break from her job indefinitely.

On vacation in an island paradise together with Bill, Emanuelle gets caught by a native tribe and is to become the local chieftain's twelfth wife. Bill confesses he has sold her for a shell necklace and some local beer. After the ceremony, a US film crew suddenly appears out of nowhere. The tribe are used as actors. Not wanting to take part in a film, Bill and Emanuelle elope, running along the beach in the sunset.

Cast
 Laura Gemser as Emanuelle
 Gabriele Tinti as Alfredo Elvize, The Duke of Mont'Elba
 Roger Browne as The Senator
 Riccardo Salvino as Bill
 Lars Bloch as Eric Van Darren
 Paola Senatore as Laura Elvize
 Maria Piera Regoli as Diana Smith
 Lorraine De Selle as Gemini
 Marina Frajese as Woman At The Beach
 Giulio Bianchi as Tony
 Efrem Appel as Joe
 Matilde Dall'Aglio
 Carlo Foschi
 Maria Renata Franco
 Giulio Massimini
 Stefania Nocilli as Janet

See also 
 List of Italian films of 1977

References

External links
 
 

1977 films
1977 horror films
1977 LGBT-related films
1970s pornographic films
Animal pornography
Emanuelle
1970s exploitation films
Films scored by Nico Fidenco
Films about kidnapping
Films directed by Joe D'Amato
Films set in New York City
Films set in Venice
Films set on islands
Italian crime films
Italian erotic horror films
1970s Italian-language films
Italian pornographic films
Pornographic horror films
Italian sexploitation films
Films about snuff films
Italian splatter films
Zoophilia in culture
Lesbian-related films
1970s Italian films
1970s French films